The 2,000-yard club is a group of eight National Football League (NFL) running backs who have rushed for 2000 yards or more in a regular season. These eight rushing seasons rank as the highest single-season rushing totals in NFL history, and reaching the 2,000-yard mark is considered a significant achievement for running backs. No running back has yet achieved this feat twice. The first 2,000-yard season was recorded in 1973 by Buffalo Bills running back O. J. Simpson. Simpson is the only player ever to have surpassed 2,000 yards in a 14-game season, as all others occurred in 16-game seasons; he finished the season with 2,003 rushing yards, averaging six yards per carry and an NFL-record 143.1 rushing yards per game. Los Angeles Rams running back Eric Dickerson, who broke the single-season rookie rushing record in 1983, recorded the second 2,000-yard season in 1984. Dickerson rushed for 2,105 yards, the current NFL rushing record, and averaged 131.6 rushing yards per game.

Detroit Lions running back Barry Sanders recorded the third 2,000-yard season in 1997, rushing for 2,053 yards. At the age of 29, Sanders was the oldest  and best back to surpass 2,000 yards. Sanders had opened the season with only 53 yards through two games, but ran for 100 yards or more in each of the last 14 games of the season and averaged 6.1 yards per carry during the season. In 1998 Denver Broncos running back Terrell Davis became the fourth player to rush for over 2,000 yards, running for 2,008 yards. Davis also recorded 21 rushing touchdowns in his 2,000-yard season, the only 2,000 yard rusher to do so. To date, Davis is the only member of the 2,000 yard club to win a Super Bowl in the year they rushed for 2,000 yards. Davis had reached the 1,000-yard mark only seven games into the season . Baltimore Ravens running back Jamal Lewis surpassed 2,000 yards in the 2003 season, recording 2,066 yards over the course of the season. 500 of these yards were recorded in two games against the Cleveland Browns, with Lewis rushing for a then-NFL record 295 yards in the first and recording 205 rushing yards in the second. Tennessee Titans running back Chris Johnson ran for 2,006 yards in 2009, averaging 5.6 yards per carry, and also recorded an NFL-record 2,509 yards from scrimmage. Minnesota Vikings back Adrian Peterson is the second most recent player to have surpassed 2,000 yards rushing, having finished the 2012 season with 2,097 yards rushing, just 8 yards short of Dickerson's record. Peterson had torn two ligaments in his left knee the previous year, making him the only player to have surpassed 2,000 yards after having reconstructive knee surgery the prior season. Titans running back Derrick Henry reached the mark on January 3, 2021, making the Titans the first franchise to have multiple 2,000-yard rushers.

Out of the eight players to have recorded a 2,000-yard rushing season, all but one (Dickerson) won the AP NFL Offensive Player of the Year Award the year that they rushed for 2,000 yards. Dickerson would go on to win the award, though, after the 1986 NFL season. Simpson, Sanders, Davis, and Peterson also won the AP Most Valuable Player (MVP) award. Simpson, Dickerson, Sanders and Davis are each members of the Pro Football Hall of Fame, which "honor[s] individuals who have made outstanding contributions to professional football"; Lewis has not been voted in, and Johnson, Peterson, and Henry are not yet eligible. Johnson has retired from the NFL, but Peterson and Henry have not.

Key

2,000-yard rushers

Notes
Notes

Footnotes

General references

External links
 National Football League
 250 best American Football League (AFL) and NFL rushing seasons

Rushing yards
Rushing yards
National Football League lists